The 29th New Zealand Parliament was a term of the Parliament of New Zealand. It opened in 1950, following the 1949 general election. It was dissolved in 1951 in preparation for the 1951 general election.  The governing Labour Party had been defeated in the election by the National Party. This marked the end of the First Labour government and the beginning of the First National government.

Additionally, this Parliament saw the final meeting of the Upper House; the Legislative Council, which was abolished on 1 December 1950, making the New Zealand Parliament a unicameral legislative body.

1949 general election

The 1949 general election was held on Tuesday, 29 November in the Māori electorates and on Wednesday, 30 November in the general electorates, respectively.

Sessions
The 29th Parliament sat for two sessions, and was prorogued on 18 July 1951.

Ministries
The National Party under Sidney Holland won the 1949 election, defeating Labour's second Fraser Ministry. Holland remained in power until 1957, when he stepped down due to ill health.

Historical context
The National Government appointed 25 new members to the New Zealand Legislative Council (the so-called Suicide Squad), so that the Legislative Council Abolition Bill could be passed.  With that legislation, the Legislative Council voted itself out of existence, and New Zealand has been unicameral since the last meeting of the Upper House on 1 December 1950.

Members

Overview
The table below shows the number of MPs in each party following the 1949 election and at dissolution:

Notes
The Working Government majority is calculated as all Government MPs less all other parties.

Initial MPs

By-elections during 29th Parliament
There was one by-election during the term of the 29th Parliament.

Notes

References

New Zealand parliaments